Putzeysia juttae is a species of sea snail, a marine gastropod mollusk in the family Eucyclidae.

References

External links
 To Encyclopedia of Life
 To World Register of Marine Species

juttae
Gastropods described in 2009